Dalil may refer to:

People
 Dalil Benyahia (b. 1990), Algerian-Swedish footballer
 Dalil Boubakeur (b. 1940), Algerian physician and scholar
 Suraya Dalil (b. 1970), Afghan physician and politician

Places
 Khal Dalil, a village in Kani Bazar Rural District, West Azerbaijan Province, Iran
 Sidi M'Hamed Dalil, a town and commune in Chichaoua Province, Morocco